The Daniel Vineyards is a family-owned estate winery located in Crab Orchard, West Virginia. The vineyard was created in 1990 at the former location of the  Twin Oaks Golf Course by Doctor C. Richard Daniel, a retired radiologist. Visitors are allowed to pick their own blueberries when in season.

These cultivars are disease resistant and use a special trellis, the "Vertical Shoot Positioning V-shaped system", developed by Dr. Daniel. By 2007 Daniel Vineyards was West Virginia's largest winery. It has hosted the West Virginia Spring Wine Festival each year since 1999. In 2008 the West Virginia Department of Conservation rated the vineyard as the third best conservation farm in  West Virginia, due in part to features such as deer training fences and vegetation around the vineyard such as Canadian hemlock, Lombardy poplar, and roses. Special events such as birthdays and weddings are held at the vineyard.

Varieties of grapes

Dr. Daniel has grown 116 varieties of grapes since founding the vineyard, 14 of which are in production as of 2013:
 Cornell University Hybrids (Cayuga White, Chardonel, Traminette)
 French-American Hybrids (Seyval blanc, St. Vincent, Vidal blanc, and Vignoles)
 Native American (Norton)
 Swenson Hybrids (Brianna, Esprit, and Sabrevois)
 University of Minnesota Hybrids (Frontenac, La Crescent, and Marquette)

Red wines include Baco noir, Blackberry, Frontenac, Marquette, Norton, Port, Pink, Sabrevois, St. Croix, and St. Vincent. White wines include Brianna, Cayuga, Chardonel, Esprit, La Crescent, Seyval, Traminette, Vidal Blanc, and Vignoles. The best selling wine is the blackberry wine, which is made from all blackberries and no grapes. It has won two bronze medals, two silver medals, and one gold medal.

References

External links 
 Wine Trail Traveler

1990 establishments in West Virginia
Tourist attractions in Raleigh County, West Virginia
Wineries in West Virginia